Archibald Daniel Ferguson (25 January 1903 – October 1971) was a Welsh footballer who played as a forward. Born in Flint, he played for Rhyl Athletic, Manchester United, Reading, Accrington Stanley, Chester, Halifax Town, Stockport County and Macclesfield Town in the 1920s and 1930s.

External links
MUFCInfo.com profile

1903 births
1971 deaths
People from Flint, Flintshire
Sportspeople from Flintshire
Welsh footballers
Reading F.C. players
Rhyl F.C. players
Manchester United F.C. players
Accrington Stanley F.C. (1891) players
Chester City F.C. players
Halifax Town A.F.C. players
Stockport County F.C. players
Macclesfield Town F.C. players
English Football League players
Association football forwards